The Young Democratic Socialists of America (YDSA) is the youth section of the Democratic Socialists of America. The organization was known as Young Democratic Socialists (YDS) until 2017.

History 

Formerly known as the Democratic Socialists of America Youth Section, the organization played a significant role in the 1980s in the movements against apartheid in South Africa and United States intervention in Central America. It helped introduce many student activists to trade union struggles, with many of the organization's alums going on to become labor organizers and union staff members. In the late 1990s, YDS chapters, most notably the ones at Ithaca College and Arizona State University, became heavily involved in the national movement against the prison-industrial complex. Chapters tried to force colleges to cancel their contracts with food service provider Sodexho Marriott because its parent company Sodexho Alliance owned stock in Corrections Corporation of America, a for-profit prison company.

More recently, the YDS had a contingent march in the NYSPC section of the United for Peace and Justice march against the Iraq War in Washington, D.C. on January 27, 2007. In September 2009, YDS members participated in a march against the G20 in Pittsburgh. In October 2010, dozens of YDS members joined the union-sponsored One Nation Working Together march in Washington, D.C.

Activities 
YDSA chapters and members are encouraged to pursue and promote a democratic socialist political education and participate in social justice activism, often taking part in anti-war, labor and student-issue marches and rallies. Each year, YDSA members vote on an agenda for the chapters to adopt. The organization published an internal newsletter called The Red Letter. Its members run and contribute to The Activist, their official publication. The organization's most visible current national activities revolve around supporting initiatives for Democratic Socialists of America (their parent organization) and organizing various national conferences, usually held in New York City.

The organization runs two annual conferences: an outreach conference in the winter that includes plenaries and workshops, and a convention during the summer that focuses on debating political direction and electing the national leadership for the following year.  In the past, outreach conferences have featured keynote speakers such as Noam Chomsky, Cornel West, journalist and author Barbara Ehrenreich, The Nation correspondent Christian Parenti and Columbia University professor Gayatri Spivak. Other speakers include Dan Cantor of the Working Families Party, author and journalist Liza Featherstone, Temple University professor Joseph Schwartz, long-time activist Steve Max and sociologist Frances Fox Piven.

National conferences have taken place in February 2016 in Brooklyn, August 2016 in Washington, D.C, and February 2019 in Berkeley, California.

Organization 
The organization is run by a coordinating committee consisting of two co-chairs and seven at-large members, previously two co-chairs and four at-large members. 

The group has a number of current chapters across the country. YDSA also has numerous members-at-large without chapters who usually work through other progressive groups to articulate an active democratic socialist presence in campus and community politics. YDS (renamed YDSA in 2017) expanded following youth support for Bernie Sanders' 2016 presidential candidacy. According to a YDSA organizer, the group expanded from 25 to 84 registered chapters between 2016 and 2019. As of January 2021, YDSA now claims 130 chapters.

See also 

 History of the socialist movement in the United States

References

External links 
 

Democratic socialist organizations in the United States
YDSA
Political youth organizations in the United States